Jerry Lee Unruh (born November 21, 1939) was a vice admiral in the United States Navy. He commanded the United States Third Fleet from 1991 to 1994.

His awards include the Legion of Merit, Meritous Service Medal (4), Air Medal (14), and the Vietnamese Cross of Gallantry.

His favorite car was his 1961 Corvette.

Over twenty years after leaving the U.S. Navy, on September 14, 2020, he joined other retired military leaders by endorsing President Donald J. Trump for reelection.

References

United States Navy admirals
1939 births
Living people